Bojan Bojanovski was the fourth director of the Administration for Security and Counterintelligence  of Macedonia.

References

 

Macedonian politicians
Year of birth missing (living people)
Living people